Miana (also Romanized as Mīānā) is a village in Banaft Rural District, Dodangeh District, Sari County, Mazandaran Province, Iran. At the 2006 census, its population was 287, in 89 families.
Miana (Pashtun tribe)

References 

Populated places in Sari County